HMS Onslaught was a British  submarine  operated by the Royal Navy.

Design and construction

The Oberon class was a direct follow on of the Porpoise-class, with the same dimensions and external design, but updates to equipment and internal fittings, and a higher grade of steel used for fabrication of the pressure hull.

Displacement was 1,610 tons standard, 2,030 tons full load when surfaced, and 2,410 tons full load when submerged. Eight  diameter torpedo tubes were fitted (six facing forward, two aft), with a total payload of 24 torpedoes. The boats were fitted with Type 186 and Type 187 sonars, and an I-band surface search radar. The standard complement was 68: 6 officers, 62 sailors.

Onslaught was laid down by Chatham Dockyard on 8 April 1959, and launched on 24 September 1960. The boat was commissioned into the Royal Navy on 14 August 1962.

Operational history

Her patrols in the Mediterranean and Baltic from 1986 to 1988 are classified.

Decommissioning and fate
Onslaught was paid off in 1990.

References

Publications

 .

 

Oberon-class submarines of the Royal Navy
Ships built in Chatham
1961 ships
Cold War submarines of the United Kingdom